The Magnificent Ambersons is an A&E Network film for television, inspired by Booth Tarkington's novel The Magnificent Ambersons. It was filmed using Orson Welles's screenplay and editing notes of the original film.  Directed by Alfonso Arau, the film stars Madeleine Stowe, Bruce Greenwood, Jonathan Rhys Meyers, Gretchen Mol, Jennifer Tilly, Dina Merrill and James Cromwell. This film does not strictly follow Welles's screenplay. It lacks several scenes included in the 1942 version, and contains essentially the same happy ending as Tarkington's novel.

Plot

Cast
 Madeleine Stowe as Isabel Amberson Minafer
 Bruce Greenwood as Eugene Morgan
 Jonathan Rhys Meyers as George Amberson Minafer
 Gretchen Mol as Lucy Morgan
 Jennifer Tilly as Fanny Minafer
 William Hootkins as Uncle George
 Dina Merrill as Mrs. Johnson
 James Cromwell as Major Amberson
 Keith Allen as George - Age 9
 Jane Brennan as Nurse

References

External links
 
 
 

2000s American films
2000s English-language films
2002 drama films
2002 television films
2002 films
A&E (TV network) original films
American drama television films
Films based on adaptations
Films based on American novels
Films based on works by Booth Tarkington
Films directed by Alfonso Arau
Films with screenplays by Orson Welles
Remakes of American films
RKO Pictures films
Television films based on books
Television remakes of films